Seol-hee is a Korean feminine given name.

People with this name include:
Yoon Seol-hee (born 1982), South Korean actress 
Seo Seol-hee (born 1988), Miss Earth Korea representative to the Miss Earth 2008 beauty pageant

Fictional characters with this name include:
Jeon Seol-hee, in 2010 South Korean television series I Am Legend
Park Seol-hee, in 2011 South Korean film In Love and War
Yoon Seol-hee, in 2013 South Korean television series Empire of Gold
Baek Seol-hee, in 2013 South Korean film The Spy: Undercover Operation
Seol-hee, in 2014 South Korean film Memories of the Sword

Korean feminine given names